Moonshadow or Moon Shadow may refer to:

 "Moonshadow" (song), a song by Cat Stevens
 "Moon Shadow", a song by English folk singer Kate Rusby from her 2005 album The Girl Who Couldn't Fly (unrelated to the Cat Stevens song)
 Moon Shadow, the birth name of musician and professional wrestler Goldy Locks.
 Moon Shadow, a character from the children's novel Dragonwings
 Moon Shadow, A.K.A. Tyler Marlocke, the protagonist in the comic book series PS238
 Moonshadow (comics), a graphic novel by J. M. DeMatteis
 Moonshadow (album), an album by Labelle
 Moonshadow, a novel by Angela Carter
 Moon Shadow, name in U.S. market for the film Colpo di luna
 Moonshadow Elves, a race of elves in The Dragon Prince

See also
 "Moonlight Shadow", song by Mike Oldfield